Teifion Davies (10 February 1940 – 8 October 2015) was an Australian boxer. He competed in the men's middleweight event at the 1960 Summer Olympics.

References

1940 births
2015 deaths
Australian male boxers
Olympic boxers of Australia
Boxers at the 1960 Summer Olympics
Place of birth missing
Middleweight boxers